Rundle College Primary/Elementary School is a private, co-ed, day school in Calgary, Alberta. The Primary/Elementary campus teaches students in Kindergarten to Grade 6, after which they can move to Rundle College Jr/Sr High School.

Athletics
Students at this school are offered the Rundle College Jr. Cobras Sports Development Program, a program to help younger students get involved in the highly athletic-based community of Rundle College. Some of these programs are:
Basketball
Football
Volleyball
Wrestling
Rugby

Dress
Rundle College is a uniform school.  Students are expected to wear a white shirt, long or short sleeved, with a burgundy cardigan, vest, or blazer over top. Students may also wear a white or black embroidered polo shirt. Males are to wear grey trousers with an ebony belt and black dress shoes, while females are given the choice of the same pants or plaid burgundy and grey skirts.

See also
 Rundle College Society
 Rundle College Jr/Sr High School

References

Private schools in Alberta
Educational institutions established in 1985
1985 establishments in Alberta